Philip Brady or Phillip Brady may refer to:
 Philip Brady (broadcaster) (born 1939), Australian media personality
 Philip Brady (politician) (1898–1995), Irish Fianna Fáil politician
 Philip Francis Brady (1932–2003), Canadian diplomat
 Phillip D. Brady (born 1951), White House staff